Jawahar Navodaya Vidyalaya, Jaswantpura (जवाहर नवोदय विद्यालय, जसवन्तपुरा) is located near the village Jaswantpura in the Bhinmal tehsil of the Jalore district. This school is residence school and all  facilities to the students is free of cost. This school established in a temporary site in 1987 under 1986 education policy. Now school have buildings for all the purposes, school building, hostels, staff quarters, multi-purpose hall where it is shifted in 1990.

The entrance test for admission into 6th and 9th class of Jawahar Navodaya Vidyalaya, Jaswantpura is being conducted by the Navodaya Vidyalaya Samiti. The school syllabus is CBSE pattern. There are classes being conducted from 6th standard to 12th standard.

Music, Computer science and SUPW are taught as optional subjects. The school has a well-furnished computer room, A Samsung smart lab with 40 latest laptops and LCD, equipped with Internet (24-hour VSAT connectivity). The school has a music room with most of the instruments available. The school also has a rich library with thousands of books. All the exam results are displayed on the website of the school. The website is managed in the supervision of the principal.

The school is located near Aravalli mountains which beautify the school in monsoon when waterfall occur during rainy season. Locality wise, this place is very calm, clean, and peaceful due to the distant location of the school from the village.

As per Jawahar Navodaya Vidyalaya samiti policy, school has separate hostels for boys and girls.

Migration
Under migration scheme the 30% students of 9th class migrated to JNV, Banvasi Kurnool  (Andhrapradesh) and almost same strength are migrated into JNV, Jaswantpura Jalor (Rajasthan). Third language is accordingly Telugu.

Address
Jawahar Navodaya Vidyalaya, Jaswantpura, Tehsil Bhinmal, District Jalore, Rajasthan PIN - 307515

References

External links
 JNV Jaswantpura website
 Navodaya Vidyalaya Samiti website

Jalore district
Educational institutions established in 1987
Jawahar Navodaya Vidyalayas in Rajasthan
1987 establishments in Rajasthan